Silver Series: Donna is the third compilation album by Filipino singer Donna Cruz, released in the Philippines in 2006 by Viva Records. The compilation album was a part of the Silver Series collection which celebrated the twenty five years of VIVA Entertainment Group in the local entertainment industry.

Background
Similar to Donna Cruz Sings Her Greatest Hits, Silver Series: Donna did not include any newly recorded material nor any promotion from Cruz. Tracks from all Cruz's studio albums except for Kurot Sa Puso and Merry Christmas Donna were included in this release.

Track listing

References

2006 compilation albums
Viva Records (Philippines) compilation albums
Donna Cruz albums